The 2012–13 Lebanese Women's Football League was the 6th edition of the Lebanese Women's Football League since its inception in 2008. Five-time defending champions Sadaka won their sixth title, while GFA came second.

League table

See also
2012–13 Lebanese Women's FA Cup

References

External links
RSSSF.com

Lebanese Women's Football League seasons
W1
2012–13 domestic women's association football leagues